Jerry Shirley (born 4 February 1952) is an English rock drummer, best known as a member of the band Humble Pie, appearing on all their albums. He is also known for his work with Fastway, Joey Molland from Badfinger, Alexis Korner, Billy Nicholls, Syd Barrett, John Entwistle, Sammy Hagar and Benny Mardones.

Career
Shirley was born in Waltham Cross, Hertfordshire, and began playing drums for the band Apostolic Intervention at an early age.  He was later recruited by Steve Marriott to join the then newly formed rock band Humble Pie when he was seventeen years old. Shirley remained Humble Pie's drummer for the majority of the group's history, and he is the only original member who played on every album. He also worked on Steve Marriott's solo projects, such as Packet of Three and was a co-founder of the popular 1980s group Fastway. Shirley co-wrote Fastway's biggest hit, "Say What You Will".

After leaving Fastway, Shirley joined the line-up of Waysted and reformed Humble Pie in the United States, with Charlie Huhn as vocalist. Shirley was the only original group member, and they were billed as Humble Pie Featuring Jerry Shirley. They performed with a fluid line-up for ten years before disbanding. During this period, Shirley also worked as a disc jockey at WNCX, a classic rock station in Cleveland, Ohio.

Shirley returned to the UK in 1999. In 2000 he reformed Humble Pie with their original bassist Greg Ridley and another former band member, guitarist and vocalist Bobby Tench. They recorded Humble Pie's eleventh studio album Back on Track (2002), and he also appeared in a memorial concert for former Humble Pie bandmate Steve Marriott. More recently he has performed with the Deborah Bonham Band and played on her album Duchess.

In 1970 he worked on Syd Barrett's two solo albums. On the debut LP The Madcap Laughs he played with David Gilmour and Roger Waters, as well as Soft Machine members Mike Ratledge, Hugh Hopper and Robert Wyatt. On this first record, Jerry shared drums with Wyatt and drummer Willie Wilson. On Barrett, he worked with David Gilmour and Richard Wright, again sharing drums with Willie Wilson.

Discography

Apostolic Intervention

Single
1967 : "(Tell Me) Have You Ever Seen Me?"/"Madame Garcia" – Immediate Records

Humble Pie

Studio albums
1969 : As Safe as Yesterday Is – Immediate Records
1969 : Town and Country – Immediate Records
1970 : Humble Pie – A&M Records
1971 : Rock On – A&M
1972 : Smokin' – A&M
1973 : Eat It – A&M
1974 : Thunderbox – A&M
1975 : Street Rats – A&M
1980 : On to Victory – Atco Records
1981 : Go for the Throat – Atco
2002 : Back on Track – Sanctuary Records

Live albums
1971 : Performance Rockin' the Fillmore – A&M Records
1995 : King Biscuit Flower Hour Presents: In Concert Humble Pie Live 1973 – King Biscuit Flower Hour Records – 908015.2
2000 : Extended Versions – BMG Special Products
2000 : Natural Born Boogie: The BBC Sessions - Band of Joy – BOJCD010
2002 : Live at the Whiskey A-Go-Go '69 – Sanctuary Records
2013 : Performance Rockin' the Fillmore: The Complete Recordings – Omnivore Recordings

Compilation albums
1973 : Lost and Found – A&M (No. 37 US)
1976 : Back Home Again – Immediate UK
1977 : Greatest Hits – Immediate UK
1982 : Best of Humble Pie – A&M
1987 : Classics Volume 14 – A&M
1994 : Early Years – Griffin
1994 : Hot n' Nasty: The Anthology – A&M
1997 : The Scrubbers Sessions – Archive/Paradigm
1999 : The Immediate Years: Natural Born Boogie – Recall (UK)
1999 : Running with the Pack – Pilot
2000 : Twentieth Century Masters: The Millennium Collection – A&M
2005 : The Atlanta Years (previously unreleased studio album (1980) and live performance (1983))
2006 : The Definitive Collection
2006 : One More for the Old Tosser

Natural Gas
1976 : Natural Gas (Private Stock PS 2011)

Magnet
1979 : Worldwide Attraction

Fastway
1983 : Fastway
1984 : All Fired Up

Waysted
1985 : The Good the Bad the Waysted

Collaborations
1970 : The Madcap Laughs by Syd Barrett - with David Gilmour, Roger Waters, Mike Ratledge, Hugh Hopper and Robert Wyatt. 
1970 : Barrett by Syd Barrett - with David Gilmour, Richard Wright and Willie Wilson. 
1971 : Smash Your Head Against the Wall by John Entwistle
1976 : Nine on a Ten Scale by Sammy Hagar
1978 : Thank God for Girls from Benny Mardones

DVD :

2001 : Steve Marriott Live by Steve Marriott

References

Further reading
Shirley, Jerry and Cohan, Tim. Best Seat in the House: Drumming in the '70s with Marriott, Frampton, and Humble Pie. Rebeats Press (2011). . This memoir of his has gone on to sell extremely well and its first edition has almost sold out. It is still available as an e-book.

1952 births
Living people
People from Waltham Cross
People from Finchley
Humble Pie (band) members
English rock drummers
Musicians from Hertfordshire
Musicians from London
Fastway (band) members
Waysted members